Johnny Smith (1922–2013) was an American jazz guitarist.

Johnny Smith or Jonny Smith may also refer to:

People
 Johnny Smith (baseball) (fl. 1940s), Negro leagues baseball player
 Johnny Smith (rugby league) (1923–2007), Australian rugby league footballer of the 1940s
 Johnny Smith (rugby union) (1922–1974), Maori rugby union player who played for New Zealand
 Johnny Smith (wrestler) (born 1965), British professional wrestler
 Johnny "Hammond" Smith (1933–1997), American soul jazz and hard bop organist

Other
 Johnny Smith (album), by jazz guitarist Johnny Smith
 Johnny Smith (Dead Zone), the protagonist of Stephen King's 1979 novel The Dead Zone

See also
John Smith (disambiguation)